Rowther (anglicised as Irauttar, Rawther, Ravuttar Ravutta, Ravuthar) is a Tamil Speaking Muslim community from the Indian state of Tamil Nadu and Kerala. They are a Tamil tribe converted to Islam by Preacher Natharshah. Even after conversion they retained their caste name. They were elite cavalrymen of Chola and Pandya kingdoms. They were traditionally a martial clan like the Maravars, and constitute large part of the multi-ethnic Tamil Muslim community. Ravuttars have also been found as Tamil polygars, zamindars and chieftains from the 16th to 18th centuries. The traditional homelands of the Ravuttars were in the interior of South Tamilakam.
 
Another theory suggests that they are descendants of Turkic peoples peoples who had come during Chola Empire but this is an unproven theory.

Etymology
The name Ravuttar meaning King, Horseman Cavalry Warrior in Tamil language (or Ravutta, Ravuthar,Rowther, Rawther) is derived (Rājaputra), in the sense of 'prince', 'nobleman', or 'horseman'. D.C. Sircar points out that Ravutta or Rahutta, as a title, means a 'subordinate ruler'. Some scholars claim that the name comes from Rathore, a name common among the Muslim Rajputs of North India. Historically, they are parts of clans traditionally holding positions as rulers and military folk. Ravuta means a high-ranking title King, lord, feudatory ruling chief.

Rahut or Rowt means Warrior, Raya means Captain Rāvuttarayan or Rāvuttakartan means high military chief of cavalry.

Demography 
Rawthers are found all over Tamil Nadu and in Kerala. Their mother tongue is Tamil in Tamil Nadu and Malayalam in Kerala. Many of them are familiar with the Perso-Arabic script. They follow the tenets of Islam and read the Quran and other religious texts in Arabic.

Culture 
Rowthers generally speak Tamil. They have their own Ravuthar Cuisine and Rawther Biryani. The elderly men wear white Vēṭṭi or White kayili while elderly women wear a white thupatti draped over a sari.

Traditional costumes also included the fez and traditional turban called 'Thalappakattu'. The community also celebrates a festival called 'Chandanakudam' every year.

Titles/surname 
Ravuttar/Rawther/Rowther are common surnames among the group, but other titles often used are below:

 Sahib
 Khan
 Shah
 Pillai/Pillay (Travancore and Tamil Nadu)
 Ambalam and Vijayan (Ramnad Zamindhari estate)
 Servai Servaikkarar (In 1730s, Ravuttan Servaikkarar (Rauten Cheerwegaren) was a high military ranked man in Ramnad kingdom.)

Identity and origins 
Ravuttars are Soldiers, officials, and literati attached to Muslim Court in the Deccan. In described as a Rāuta, Rāutta or Rāvutta derived from Sanskrit Rajaputra and was often assumed by subordinate rulers.

Sundara Pandyan sought help, in a civil war, from Sultan Ala-ud-din Khilji who ruled much of northern India from Delhi. Khilji agreed to help Sundara Pandyan and ordered General Malik Kafur's army to march into the peninsula in 1311. Thus the first invasion of Tamil Nadu from Delhi was a direct result of an internal quarrel in the Pandyan royal family.

Later, Chola kings too invited artisans of the Seljuk Empire who belonged to the Hanafi school. During 8th-10th centuries, an armada of Turkish traders settled in Tharangambadi, Nagapattinam, Karaikal, Muthupet, Koothanallur and Podakkudi.

These new settlements were now added to the Rowther community. There are some Anatolian and Safavid inscriptions found in a wide area from Tanjore to Thiruvarur and in many villages. These inscriptions are seized by the Madras museum. Some Turkish inscriptions were also stolen from the Big Mosque of Koothanallur in 1850.

There are two factions of Rowthers in Tamil Nadu, Tamils cavalry warriors covers majority of Tamil Nadu while Seljuk Turkic clans remains in Tharangambadi, Nagapattinam, Karaikal, Muthupet, Koothanallur and Podakkudi. Both now Tamil and Turkish Hanafi expanded with Population and some circumstantial evidence in historical sources that the Rowthers are part related to Maravar converts. Ravuttars worked in the administration of the Vijayanagar Nayaks.

Social system: kinship 
The Rowthers were an endogamous group. But like all modern societies, they have adapted to modern norms and rituals.

Kinship terms 
 Aththa or Ata : Father
 Amma : Mother
 Thambi : Little Brother
 Annan : Elder Brother
 Thangachi : Younger sister
 Akka : Elder sister
 Ayya/Radha : Father's father
 Aththamma/Radhi : Fathers mother
 Ammatha/Nanna : Mothers father
 Ammama/Nannimma : Mothers mother
 Periatha : Father's elder brother / husband of mother's elder sister
 Periyamma : Mother's elder sister / Wife of father's elder brother
 Khalamma/Chiththi : Mothers younger sister
 Mama /Mami : Uncle/ Aunty

Rites and rituals

Marriage 
Nevertheless, in cities, inter-marriages do occur, although they are rare" (Vines, 1973). Parallel and cross-cousins are potential spouses. Earlier, marriages were performed soon after a girl attained puberty, but now girls get married between 18 and 20 and boys between 22 and 25. Most marriages are negotiated by the elders. Monogamy is the norm.  They remember their historic valor during their marriage ceremonies, where the bridegroom is conducted in a horseback procession.

Occupational activities 
Traditionally the Rowthers were landlords and landowning community (historically mentioned as Rowthers are brave cavaliers and early Muslim horse-traders in Tamil literature) but now they are engaged in various occupations, mostly their own businesses. They deal in gemstones, gold, textiles, and real estate and participate in the restaurant industry, construction work, and general merchandising. Some are professionals, such as doctors, engineers, advocates, and teachers.

Administration and justice 
There is no traditional caste council or panchayat as such among the Rawthers. Learned and elderly persons act as advisers. The Rawther have an association that preaches against dowry and collects funds for charity.

Religion and culture 
The Rawther belong to the Sunni sect of Islam and the Hanafi school. They follow the five basic tenets of Islam, which are, reciting the Kalima, offering prayer five times a day, observing fast during the month of Ramadan, giving charity (zakah) to the poor, and going on the Haj pilgrimage. The major festivals celebrated are Eid-Ul-Fitr, Chandanakudam and Bakr-id.

Intercommunity relations 
The Rawther share a ritual and social linkage with other sects of Muslims. They mix freely with their neighbors and friends belonging to other communities, and exchange food and sweets during festivals. They share mosques and burial grounds with others belonging to the Sunni sect.

Closeness in Tamil inscriptions and literature 
The well-known legend of the Shiva saint Manikkavacakar of the 9th century is connected with the purchase of horses for the Pandya king. In that, the god Shiva who appeared in disguise as a horse trader to protect the saint and he is called as Rowther. Also, the Tamil god Murugan is praised by saint Arunagirinathar as சூர் கொன்ற ரவுத்தனே (Oh Ravuttan, who vanquished the Demon) and மாமயிலேரும் ரவுத்தனே (Oh Ravuttan, who rides on the great peacock) in his Kanthar Alangaram (கந்தர் அலங்காரம்) and in Kanthar Venba (கந்தர் வெண்பா).

This shows the religious harmony of Rowthers and Saivites in early Tamilakam till now.

Initially, most horses and warriors were drawn from Persia and Central Asia. For the Indian population, the most prominent feature of these warriors was their distinctive religion or ethnic identity but their military and equine expertise, which was always for hire. Apart from being loosely labeled Muslims or Turks (Turushka), these mounted men were known as Ashvapatis or Irauttars (lords of horses).

There were Tamil Ravuttars working in the administration of the Vijayanagara Empire in the Khurram Kunda. The inscription details the dedication of the land by the Rowther to a Murugan temple in Cheyyur.
Muththaal Ravuttar (meaning Muslim Rowther is a Prakrit derivation from raja-putra) figures as Tamil male deities who protect Tamil land.

Modernisation 
The Rowthers give importance to education. They are one of the most prominent Muslim groups in south India, making their mark in various fields, from jurisprudence to Entertainment.

Notable peoples

See also 
Indo-Turkic people
Maravars
Quaid-e-Millath
Tamil Muslim
Tamil people

References

Bibliography 
J. P. Mulliner. Rise of Islam in India.  University of Leeds chpt. 9. Page 215

 Mines, Mattison. Social Stratification among the Muslim Tamils in Tamil Nadu, South India, Imtiaz Ahmad, ed, Caste, and Social Stratification among the Muslims, Manohar book service, New Delhi, 1973.
 Nanjundayya, H.V. and lyer, LK.A, 1931, The Mysore Tribes and Castes, IV, The Mysore University. Mysore.
 Thurston, E., Castes and Tribes of Southern India, Government Press, Madras, 1909.

Muslim communities lists
History of Tamil Nadu
Muslim communities of India
Social groups of Tamil Nadu